|}

References

Kalikot
Kalikot District